Shayna Powless (born January 8, 1994) is an American professional racing cyclist. She is of Oneida descent through her father. She grew up in Sacramento, California and played a variety of sports whilst growing up, but initially gravitated towards mountain bike racing during her high school years. In 2013 Powless was crowned Under-23 US national mountain bike champion in her first season in that age category. She took up road bicycle racing when she joined the cycling team at the University of California, Los Angeles. She signed to ride for the UCI Women's Team  for the 2019 women's road cycling season. She is the daughter of Olympic marathon runner Jen Allred and the sister of fellow racing cyclist Neilson Powless. She has been in a relationship with Canadian American football player Eli Ankou since 2013, after the couple met at UCLA: as of 2021 the couple were engaged.

References

External links
 

1994 births
Living people
American female cyclists
Oneida people
Sportspeople from Sacramento, California
21st-century American women
Native American sportspeople
Cyclists from California